Edward Blencowe Gould (Stoke-in-Teignhead, Devon 9 August 1847  Devon 16 November 1916) was a British Consul in Bangkok, Thailand.

Gould was the first to bring Siamese cats to Europe in 1884 when he brought a pair back to Britain for his sister, Lilian Jane Gould, who went on to be co-founder of the Siamese Cat Club in 1901. The cats were shown at The Crystal Palace in 1885.

Career
Gould started his career as a junior interpreter in Siam (now called Thailand) on 20 January 1868. Shortly after he became first, and later second, assistant on 1 May 1878. He became Consul in Siam on 27 November 1885 before being transferred to Port Said, Egypt on 13 August 1891 and then Consul General in Alexandria on 1 November 1897.

Family
In 1895, he married Alice Elizabeth Gordon (1870unknown). They had no children.

He retired on 3 November 1909, and died seven years later in 1916, aged 69, at his home in Devon.

His brother was the actor James Nutcombe Gould (18491899).

References

1847 births
1916 deaths
British expatriates in Thailand
British diplomats in East Asia
People from Teignbridge (district)